The Kiss of Fire (French: Naples au baiser de feu) is a 1937 French romantic comedy film directed by Augusto Genina and starring Tino Rossi, Michel Simon, Mireille Balin and Viviane Romance. The film is based on the 1924 novel Naples au baiser de feu by Auguste Bailly. It had previously been made as a 1925 silent film and was later adapted again for a remake Napoli terra d'amore in 1954.

It was primarily shot at the Saint-Laurent-du-Var Studios in Nice with some location shooting in Naples. The film's sets were designed by the art director Guy de Gastyne.

Synopsis
Mario Esposito a singer who performs in a Naples restaurant is in love with his owner's niece Assunta and wants to marry her. However through his friend Michel he encounters another woman, Lolita, who lures him away from his true love. Eventually he is able to see the mistake he is making.

Cast
 Tino Rossi as Mario Esposito
 Michel Simon as Michel
 Mireille Balin as Assunta
 Marcel Dalio as Le photographe
 Viviane Romance as Lolita
 Leda Ginelly as Sylvia
 Jane Loury as Tante Teresa
 Joe Alex as Le soutier
 Marcel Bauçay as l'écailler
 Lucien Callamand as Le dîneur 
 Jean-François Martial as 	L'administrateur 
 Georges Térof as Le vendeur

References

Bibliography
 Goffredo Plastino & Joseph Sciorra. Neapolitan Postcards: The Canzone Napoletana as Transnational Subject. Scarecrow Press, 2016.

External links

1937 films
1930s French-language films
Films directed by Augusto Genina
1937 comedy films
French comedy films
French black-and-white films
Films set in Naples
Remakes of French films
Films based on French novels
1930s French films